The 1997 African Judo Championships is the 19th edition of the African Judo Championships, organised by the African Judo Union. It took place in Casablanca, Morocco from 17 to 19 July 1997.

Medal overview

Men

Women

Medal table

References

External links
 

African Championships
African Judo Championships
International sports competitions hosted by Morocco
Judo competitions in Morocco
July 1997 sports events in Africa